Macelj is the name of a village and a forest in northern Croatia bordering on Slovenia. There is an official border crossing in Macelj, and the end of the A2 highway. The villages are administratively divided into Gornji Macelj (Upper), population 204, and Donji Macelj (Lower), population 566.

At the end of World War II in 1945, the forests near Macelj were the location of the Macelj massacre.

Macelj has the most frequently congested border crossing in Croatia on the Slovenian border. The Slovenian village opposite Macelj is Zgornje Gruškovje.

References

Croatia–Slovenia border crossings
Populated places in Krapina-Zagorje County